Rendsburg station is located in the city of Rendsburg in the German state of Schleswig-Holstein and is at the junction of the Neumünster–Flensburg and Rendsburg Kiel lines. It is currently operated by Deutsche Bahn, which classifies it as a category 4 station. There used to be a direct line from Rendsburg to Husum via Erfde, as distinct from the current route via Jübek. A short section of the Erfde line is still used for the carriage of freight.

At the beginning of the 20th century, the Kiel Canal was built as along with Rendsburg High Bridge over it and the Rendsburg Loop, which allowed trains to continue to use Rendsburg station. The station’s roof was renovated from 2007 to 2009. Later, the platforms were rehabilitated. Following the completion of the renovation the station it has five tracks, four of which have a platform.

History 

The approximately 34 km-long Neumünster–Flensburg railway, funded by local interests, was opened by the Rendsburg-Neumünster Railway Company (Rendsburg-Neumünstersche Eisenbahn) between Neumünster and the station then known as Rendsburg-Glacis as part of the Jutland Line (Jütlandlinie) on 18 September 1845. This was followed on 1 January 1847 by a connection to the port railway from Rendsburg-Glacis to Rendsburg-Obereider.

Operations 
In long-distance traffic, since 9 December 2007, Intercity-Express trains on the Aarhus–Hamburg–Berlin route have stopped in Rendsburg and Eurocity trains on the Aarhus–Hamburg route. There is also a pair of InterCity trains on the weekend that run directly from  Flensburg station to Berlin and Cologne, stopping at Rendsburg. On Sundays, two different InterCity services run to Flensburg.

DB Regionalbahn Schleswig Holstein (RB-SH) operates Regional-Express and Regionalbahn services between Neumünster and Flensburg every hour or two hours.

The Nord-Ostsee-Bahn (NOB, now operated by Veolia Verkehr) operates services on the Husum–Jübek–Schleswig–Rendsburg–Kiel route with modern trains every hour. The Husum–Kiel route in 2009 will be operated by DB Regio from 2011.

It is planned is to upgrade the Kiel–Rendsburg line to allow services at half-hour intervals.

Long-distance and regional transport

Tracks 
The station has five tracks, four of which are located on a platform. The tracks the movement of persons to be spanned by a platform area. Trains leave as follows:
Platform track 1: long-distance and regional services to Hamburg, RB-SH regional services to Neumünster, RE-SH regional express services to Kiel.
 Platform track 2: NOB regional services to Kiel
 Platform track 3: long-distance services to Denmark, RB-SH regional services to Flensburg/Padborg, NOB regional services to Husum/Bad St. Peter-Ording
 Platform track 4: no scheduled services

Gallery

Notes

External links 

Railway stations in Schleswig-Holstein
Railway stations in Germany opened in 1845
Establishments in Schleswig-Holstein in 1845
Rendsburg-Eckernförde